Hammad (also Romanized as Ḩammād, Hammād, and Ḩamād; also known as Ḩamād-e Seyyed Sattār) is a village in Tarrah Rural District, Hamidiyeh District, Ahvaz County, Khuzestan Province, Iran. At the 2006 census, its population was 309, in 44 families.

References 

Populated places in Ahvaz County